The 1994 NCAA Division I Tennis Championships were the 48th annual championships to determine the national champions of NCAA Division I men's singles, doubles, and team collegiate tennis in the United States.

Defending champions USC defeated Stanford in the championship final, 4–3, to claim the Trojan's third team national title (and third title in four years).

Host sites
The men's tournaments were played at the Courtney Tennis Center at the University of Notre Dame in South Bend, Indiana. 

The men's and women's tournaments would not be held at the same site until 2006.

See also
NCAA Division II Tennis Championships (Men, Women)
NCAA Division III Tennis Championships (Men, Women)

References

External links
List of NCAA Men's Tennis Champions

NCAA Division I tennis championships
NCAA Division I Men's Tennis Championships
NCAA Division I Men's Tennis Championships
NCAA Division I Men's Tennis Championships